The People's Republic of Benin (sometimes translated as Benin Popular Republic or Popular Republic of Benin) was a socialist state located in the Gulf of Guinea on the African continent, which would become present-day Benin. The People's Republic was established on 30 November 1975, after the 1972 coup d'état in the Republic of Dahomey. It effectively lasted until 1 March 1990, with the adoption of a new constitution, and the abolition of Marxism–Leninism in the nation in 1989.

History 

On 26 October 1972, the Armed Forces led by Commander Mathieu Kérékou overthrew the government in a coup d'état, suspended the constitution and dissolved both the National Assembly and the Presidential Council. On 30 November 1972, it released the keynote address of New Politics of National Independence. The territorial administration was reformed, mayors and deputies replacing traditional structures (village chiefs, convents, animist priests, etc.). On 30 November 1974, before an assembly of stunned notables in the city of Abomey, he gave a speech proclaiming the formal accession of his government to Marxism–Leninism. His government grew closer to the Soviet Union but sought to maintain good relations with Western countries. The People's Revolutionary Party of Benin, designed as a vanguard party, was created on the same day as the country's only legal party. The first year of the government was marked by purges in the state apparatus. President Kérékou condemned and sometimes executed various representatives of the former political regime. On 30 November 1975, with the first anniversary of the speech of Abomey, Kérékou changed the country's name to Benin, named after the Benin Empire that had once flourished in neighboring Nigeria (south-central). The National Day was set for 30 November referring to three days of 1972, 1974, and 1975, dubbed by the regime the Three Glorious.

In 1974, under the influence of young revolutionaries - the "Ligueurs" - the government embarked on a socialist program: nationalization of strategic sectors of the economy, reform of the education system, establishment of agricultural cooperatives and new local government structures, and a campaign to eradicate "feudal forces" including tribalism.

Attempted coup 

In January 1977, an attempted coup, called Operation Shrimp, led by the mercenary Bob Denard and supported by France, Gabon, and Morocco failed and it helped to harden the regime, which was officially moving toward the way of a government-political party. The constitution was adopted on 26 August of that year, Article 4 stating:

A basic law established an all-powerful national assembly.

Decline 
Benin tried to implement extensive programs of economic and social development, but did not get results. Mismanagement and corruption undermined the country's economy. The industrialization strategy by the internal market of Benin caused an escalation of foreign debt. Between 1980 and 1985, the annual service of its external debt raised from 20 to 49 million, while its GNP dropped from 1.402 to 1.024 billion and the stock of debt exploded from 424 to 817 million. The three former presidents, Hubert Maga, Sourou Migan Apithy, and Justin Ahomadegbe (imprisoned in 1972) were released in 1981.

A new constitution was adopted in 1978, and the first elections for the National Revolutionary Assembly were held in 1979. Kérékou was elected unopposed to a four-year term as president in 1980 and reelected in 1984. The National Revolutionary Assembly was nominally the highest source of state power, but in practice did little more than rubber-stamp decisions already made by Kérékou and the PRPB.

In the 1980s, Benin's economic situation became increasingly critical. The country experienced high economic growth rates (15.6 percent in 1982, 4.6 percent in 1983 and 8.2 percent in 1984), but Nigeria's closure of its border with Benin led to a sharp decline in customs and tax revenues. The state was no longer able to pay the salaries of civil servants. Agriculture was disorganized, the Commercial Bank of Benin ruined, and communities were largely paralyzed due to lack of budget. On the political front, the violations of human rights, with cases of torture of political prisoners, contributed to social tension: the church and the unions opposed more openly the regime. Plans for the International Monetary Fund (IMF) imposed in 1987 draconian economic measures: 10% additional levy on wages, hiring freezes, and compulsory retirements. On June 16, 1989, the People's Republic of Benin signed with the IMF a first adjustment plan, in exchange for enhanced structural adjustment facility (ESAF) of 21.9 million Special Drawing Rights of the IMF. Changes that were promised in the agreement with the IMF included a reduction in public expenditure and tax reform, privatizations, reorganization or liquidation of public enterprises, a policy of liberalization and the obligation to enter into that borrowing at concessional rates. The IMF agreement set off a massive strike of students and staff, requiring the payment of their salaries and their scholarships. On 22 June 1989, the country signed a rescheduling agreement first with the Paris Club, for a total of $199 million and Benin was granted a 14.1% reduction of its debt.

Dissolution 

The social and political turmoil, catastrophic economic situation and fall of the socialist governments in Eastern Europe led President Kérékou to agree to bring down his leadership. In February 1989, a pastoral letter signed by eleven bishops of Benin expressed its condemnation of the People's Republic. On 7 December 1989, Kérékou took the lead and surprised the people disseminating an official statement announcing the abandonment of Marxism–Leninism, the liquidation of the Political Bureau, and the closure of the party's central committee. The Government accepted the establishment of a National Conference bringing together representatives of different political movements. The Conference opened on 19 February 1990: Kérékou expressed himself in person on 21 February, publicly recognising the failure of his policy. The work of the Conference decided to draft a new constitution and the establishment of a democratic process provided by a provisional government entrusted to a prime minister. Kérékou remained head of state on a temporary basis. Kérékou said on 28 February to the attention of the Conference: "I accept all the conclusions of your work."

A transitional government was set up in 1990, paving the way for the return of a multi-party system. The new constitution was adopted by referendum in December 1990. The official name of Benin was preserved for the country, which became the Republic of Benin. In the presidential election in March 1991, Prime Minister Nicéphore Soglo defeated Kérékou, winning 67.7% of the vote. Kérékou accepted the result and left office. He became president again when he defeated Soglo in the next election in March 1996, having meanwhile dropped all references to Marxism and atheism and having become an evangelical pastor. His return to power involved no recovery of a Marxist–Leninist government in Benin.

See also 
 Cold War § Competition in the Third World

References 

Benin
Political history of Benin
20th century in Benin
Benin
1990 in Benin
Benin
Benin
Communism in Benin
Benin
Benin